Sir Robert Worsley 4th Baronet (c. 1669–1747) was a British politician who sat in the House of Commons from 1715 to 1722. 

Worsley was the eldest son of Sir Robert Worsley, 3rd Baronet, MP of Appuldurcombe and his wife Mary Herbert, daughter of Hon. James Herbert of Kingsey, Buckinghamshire. In 1676, aged seven, he succeeded to the baronetcy and the manor of Appuldurcombe on the death of his father. He matriculated at Christ Church, Oxford on 17 December 1684, aged 15. He married by licence dated 13 August 1690 Frances Thynne, daughter of Thomas Thynne, 1st Viscount Weymouth, of Longleat, Wiltshire.

Worsley was Deputy Lieutenant of Hampshire from 1699 to 1702. In 1702, he started rebuilding Appuldurcombe House which had been in his family since 1527. The architect was John James.

Worsley had an interest at the parliamentary seat of Newtown (Isle of Wight). His brother  Henry represented the seat from 1705 but was sent as Ambassador to Portugal in 1713. Worsley stood in his brother's place at the 1715 general election, was returned as Member of Parliament for the seat and acted as place-holder for his brother in case he returned from Portugal. He was classed as a Tory but often voted with the Whigs. He supported the Administration on the Peerage Bill but voted against the Septennial Bill and the repeal of the Occasional Conformity and Schism Acts. He did not stand again in 1722; his brother Henry had another posting as Governor of Barbados.

Worsley died on 29 July 1747, with seven surviving daughters but no male heir. He left  his mainland Hampshire property to Robert Carteret, 3rd Earl Granville, the son of his daughter, Frances. The baronetcy went to his cousin James Worsley. He had never seen his house at Appuldurcombe fully completed; it passed in trust to Sir Thomas Worsley, 6th Baronet, the son of his cousin James.

A monument was erected in his memory on Stenbury Down, overlooking his house.

References

1660s births
1747 deaths
17th-century English nobility
18th-century English nobility
Members of Parliament for the Isle of Wight
British MPs 1715–1722
Baronets in the Baronetage of England
Robert Worsley, 4th Baronet